The 1995 ARL premiership was the 88th season of professional rugby league football in Australia, and the first to be run by the Australian Rugby League following the hand-over of the Premiership's administration by the New South Wales Rugby League. For the first time since 1988, the Premiership expanded again, with the addition of two new clubs from Queensland; North Queensland Cowboys, based in Townsville, and South Queensland Crushers, based in Brisbane. And for the first time ever outside the borders of New South Wales and Queensland, and indeed, Australia, the addition of two other new clubs from Western Australia, Western Reds (later Perth Reds), based in Perth, and from Auckland, Auckland Warriors, based in Auckland. This saw a total of twenty teams, the largest number in the League's history, compete during the regular season for the J J Giltinan Shield, which was followed by a series of play-off finals between the top eight teams that culminated in a grand final for the Winfield Cup between the newly re-branded Sydney Bulldogs and the Manly-Warringah Sea Eagles.

The 1995 season also saw the first major consequences of the Super League war, with the ARL's refusal to select players from the eight clubs (which included every club that had won the premiership since 1988) for State of Origin or Test matches, including the 1995 Rugby League World Cup, who had aligned with News Ltd's proposed Super League.

Season summary

1995 would prove to be a year of massive change for the League. In addition to the introduction of four new teams, it was the last year of the premiership's association with Rothmans and the Winfield brand and consequently the final year that clubs competed for the Winfield Cup.

There had been a cloud over the league for some time in the form of rumours and speculation about the Super League, but the ensuing dispute was more extensive than almost any commentors and analysts had predicted. The subsequent Super League war would have massive impacts on the sport in Australia and would substantially harm the league's popular support and grassroots structures.

The 1995 season was played in front of a background of legal actions which did large damage to interpersonal relations within the league, with players and managers jockeying for position. Players who had signed with the new Super League venture were forbidden by the ARL from participating in the 1995 State of Origin. Queensland and New South Wales selectors were limited to selecting players only from ARL-aligned clubs.

The usual twenty-two regular season rounds were played from March till August. However the large number of teams meant a resulting top eight would battle it out in the finals rather than the usual five. These were Manly, Canberra, Brisbane, Cronulla, Newcastle, Sydney Bulldogs, St. George and North Sydney (who made it in due to Auckland being penalised for an interchange infringement).
Cronulla-Sutherland's halfback Paul Green was awarded the 1995 Rothmans Medal. The Dally M Award was given to Canberra's five-eighth, Laurie Daley who was also named Rugby League Week's player of the year. Manly-Warringah's Steve Menzies became the first forward for 50 years to top the season's try-scoring list, while his teammate Matthew Ridge set a club point scoring record of 257 points (11 tries, 106 goals and 1 field goal) to be the league's leading point scorer for the year.

By the end of the regular season, the ARL's inaugural 20-team competition had set a new record for aggregate match attendances of 3,061,338.

Advertising
1995 marked the final year of the New South Wales Rugby League's sponsorship arrangement with Rothmans and Winfield due to the Federal Government's blanket ban on cigarette advertising in Australia effective from 1 January 1996. It was consequently the final year of a seven-year association with Tina Turner and the end of an era in Australian sports marketing. 

As in 1994 the New South Wales Rugby League and its advertising agency Hertz Walpole returned to the original 1989 recording of The Best by Turner to underscore the season launch advertisement. Footage from the studio bluescreen shoot taken during Turner's 1993 Sydney visit was used in the final advertisements. The enduring images are of Turner performing the song on an elevated stage in front of the fluttering banners of the 20 clubs that would participate in 1995's expanded competition.

Teams
When the Australian Rugby League began taking bids for additional teams to begin playing in 1995, it was expected that only two teams would enter. The Auckland Warriors were the first club to be accepted, with the final place being fought for by South Queensland, North Queensland and Perth. The Australian Rugby League later announced that all three clubs had been accepted, taking the number of teams from 16 in 1994 to 20 in 1995, the highest it had ever been and would ever be.

With the addition of the Auckland Warriors, North Queensland Cowboys, South Queensland Crushers and Western Reds the 1995 season involved an unprecedented twenty clubs, including five Sydney-based foundation teams, another six from Sydney, one from Newcastle, one from Wollongong, two from Brisbane, one from Gold Coast, one from Townsville, one from Auckland, one from Canberra and one from Perth, who all contested the premiership, making it the largest competition in terms of participation in Australia's history.

With the storm that would be the Super League war already brewing in the background, three clubs based in Sydney suburbs, in an effort to position themselves favourably as battle lines were being drawn up, re-branded themselves for the 1995 season with less geographically distinct names: the Balmain Tigers became the 'Sydney Tigers', the Canterbury-Bankstown Bulldogs became the 'Sydney Bulldogs', and the Eastern Suburbs Roosters became the 'Sydney City Roosters'.

Ladder

Auckland Warriors were stripped of 2 competition points due to exceeding the replacement limit in round 3.

Finals
A new finals system involving eight teams instead of the previous five was introduced for the expanded 1995 competition. The final eight was to be made of four clubs who would ultimately prove loyal to the Australian Rugby League (Manly-Warringah, St. George, North Sydney and Newcastle) and four clubs who would join Super League's rebel ranks (Sydney Bulldogs, Canberra, Brisbane and Cronulla-Sutherland Sharks). The Grand Final was played out by a team from each faction, being the Manly-Warringah Sea Eagles and the Sydney Bulldogs.

Grand final

Having finished in sixth place at the end of the regular season, the Bulldogs managed a history-making finals surge, winning three sudden death matches to make the grand final. Canterbury were ahead at half-time 6-4 after a tight contest dominated by defence in the opening half. 

The Bulldogs scored 11 unanswered points in the second half to secure the club's seventh NSWRL/ARL title and their first of the decade. This was despite the fact that in the game they lost the scrum count 3-5 and the penalty count 9-10. Manly's 22-3 season win–loss record was the best not to have secured the premiership.

At game's end Lamb enjoyed the rare honour of celebrating as a retiring victorious skipper, although he surprisingly returned for the 1996 season.

The performance of Eddie Ward, refereeing his NSWRL/ARL first grand final (Ward had previously officiated in Brisbane Rugby League grand finals including the infamous 1990 decider), was subject to some post match controversy.
Rugby League Week commented: "Two of Canterbury's three tries appeared to have resulted from borderline passes, another came on the seventh tackle, and a fourth - which in fact was a fair try - was disallowed"

Sydney Bulldogs 17 (Tries: Price, Hughes, Silva. Goals: Halligan 2/5. Field Goal: Lamb.)

Manly-Warringah 4 (Goals: Ridge 2/2.)

Clive Churchill Medallist: Jim Dymock

Title and the Sydney Bulldogs name
After a grand final appearance the previous season in which they lost to Canberra, the Bulldogs rebranded from the Canterbury-Bankstown Bulldogs to the Sydney Bulldogs in 1995. This short-lived rebrand saw the club capture its seventh title in its first season under the new name, before it was altered to Canterbury Bulldogs in 1997 by Super League, changed again to Bulldogs RLFC in the 2000s and eventually reverted back to its original name in 2010.

Player statistics
The following statistics are as of the conclusion of Round 22.

Top 5 point scorers

Top 5 try scorers

Top 5 goal scorers

See also
1995 State of Origin series
Super League war

References

External links
 Rugby League Tables - Season 1995 The World of Rugby League
Australian Rugby League season 1995 at rleague.com
ARL season 1995 at rugbyleagueproject.com
Results: 1991-2000 at rabbitohs.com.au

National Rugby League seasons
ARL season
ARL season